AISG may refer to:
 Antenna interface standards group
 American International School of Guangzhou